Leslie Capewell (born 13 February 1948) is an English former professional darts player who competed in the 1980s.

Darts career
Capewell qualified to compete at the World Professional Darts Championship three times - in 1981, 1982 and 1983 but only won one match - a first round victory over Stuart Holden in 1983. His second round match ended in defeat to Keith Deller, who went on to take the title that year.

His other appearances at the World Championship ended in first round defeats - in 1981 to Allan Hogg and in 1982 to Stefan Lord.

World championship results

BDO
 1981: 1st round (lost to Allan Hogg 0-2) (sets)
 1982: 1st round (lost to Stefan Lord 0-2) 
 1983: 2nd round (lost to Keith Deller 1-3)

External links
Profile and stats on Darts Database

English darts players
Living people
British Darts Organisation players
1948 births